Ryan Matthew Church (born October 14, 1978) is a former Major League Baseball outfielder. He played for the Montreal Expos / Washington Nationals, New York Mets, Atlanta Braves, Pittsburgh Pirates, and Arizona Diamondbacks.

Career

Minors
Drafted by the Cleveland Indians in the 14th round of the 2000 Major League Baseball Draft, Church signed June 7, 2000, after graduation from the University of Nevada, Reno. By January , he was traded by the Indians with Maicer Izturis to the Montreal Expos for Scott Stewart.

Montreal Expos / Washington Nationals

Church made his major league debut for the Expos in August 2004, struggling in the 30 games he played in the last two months of the season. He ended the season with a .187 batting average.

After struggling in the first month of the  season Church was considered a candidate for the Rookie of the Year Award, until he injured himself running into the outfield wall at PNC Park on June 22, 2005. At the time of the incident, Church was batting .325 with a .544 slugging percentage. After the incident, Church made two trips to the disabled list and was unable to match his hitting performance from the first half of the season.

In , Church was demoted to Triple-A New Orleans after struggling early in the year. However, Church was sent back to the majors on July 23, and ended up hitting .276 with a career best 10 home runs and .892 OPS. His 10 home runs in just 196 at-bats in 2006 projects to around 30 home runs for an entire season.

In , Church had career highs in games (144), at bats (470), runs (57), hits (128), doubles (43), home runs (15), and RBI (70). He finished the year batting .272, slugging .464 and a .813 OPS.

New York Mets
After the 2007 season, Church was mentioned in trade talks, with the Chicago Cubs, Los Angeles Angels of Anaheim and Minnesota Twins all reportedly interested in his services. However, on November 30, 2007, Church was traded, along with Brian Schneider, to the New York Mets for Lastings Milledge.

In spring training , Church was involved in a collision with first baseman Marlon Anderson that resulted in a Grade 2 concussion for Church. He recovered without any serious injuries. On May 20, 2008, Church suffered a minor concussion while sliding into Atlanta Braves shortstop Yunel Escobar. It appeared as though when Church initially slid, his head made contact with Escobar's right knee. After Church struck his head, he slid about eight feet past second base with his forehead dragging on the dirt. Church made his return to the starting lineup on June 1, 2008, against the Los Angeles Dodgers, collecting three hits including a home run and a double. However, he was placed on the disabled list with aftereffects of the concussion. On September 3, Church had his second career grand slam, off Dave Bush. On September 28, Church made the final out in Shea Stadium history in a 4–2 Mets loss.

Atlanta Braves
On July 10, 2009, he was traded to the Atlanta Braves for Jeff Francoeur, but was designated for assignment on December 8, 2009 in order to make room for the return of Rafael Soriano.

On December 12, 2009, the Braves decided to non-tender Church, making him a free agent.

Pittsburgh Pirates
On January 11, 2010, Church agreed to a deal with the Pittsburgh Pirates.

Arizona Diamondbacks
On July 31, 2010, Church, Bobby Crosby and D. J. Carrasco were traded to the Arizona Diamondbacks for Chris Snyder and Pedro Ciriaco. He was non-tendered following the 2010 season, despite a .265/.345/.490 line in 55 plate appearances with the Diamondbacks.

Controversy
In 2005, the Nationals suspended Jon Moeller, a volunteer chaplain, and issued an apology after Church, a devout Christian, revealed conversations he had with him about a Jewish former girlfriend. Church told the Washington Post that the chaplain nodded when he asked whether Jews were "doomed" because they "don't believe in Jesus." After Jewish community leaders complained, Church issued a statement saying, "I am not the type of person who would call into question the religious beliefs of others."

References
Notes

External links

 

1978 births
Living people
Akron Aeros players
American expatriate baseball players in Canada
Arizona Diamondbacks players
Atlanta Braves players
Baseball players from California
Binghamton Mets players
Brooklyn Cyclones players
Columbus RedStixx players
Edmonton Trappers players
Gulf Coast Mets players
Harrisburg Senators players
Kinston Indians players
Mahoning Valley Scrappers players
Major League Baseball outfielders
Montreal Expos players
New Orleans Zephyrs players
New York Mets players
Nevada Wolf Pack baseball players
People from Lompoc, California
Pittsburgh Pirates players
Baseball players from Atlanta
Washington Nationals players